The Hafei Zhongyi is a cabover microvan produced by the Chinese manufacturer Hafei Motor and developed in partnership with Pininfarina.

Overview
The Zhongyi is sold in Brazil and Uruguay under the brand Effa Motors.

It was presented in 1999 Beijing Motor Show. 

In December 2007, Zhongyi was launched in Chile together with the Ruiyi and Lobo. Microvans were extremely popular in Chile during the late 1970s and 1980s, and are widely known as pan de molde (sliced bread).

The Zhongyi was sold as a utility van in the United States by MAG International Inc. under the name "C-MAG".

See also
 Hafei Ruiyi

References

External links 
 Technical specifications for Hafei Carga

Hafei
Microvans
Vans
Cab over vehicles
Pininfarina
2000s cars
Vehicles introduced in 1999